Steven Don Bennion (born August 17, 1941) has served as president of Snow College, Ricks College, and Southern Utah University.

Bennion was born and raised in Salt Lake City, Utah to educator Lowell L. Bennion and Merle Colton.  He served a mission for the Church of Jesus Christ of Latter-day Saints (LDS Church) in Scotland and earned a bachelor's degree from the University of Utah.  He married Marjorie Hopkins in the Salt Lake Temple in 1963.  Bennion went to Cornell University where he earned an MPA degree.  Following this he worked for the state of Wisconsin and then the University of Wisconsin-Madison in budget positions.  He also received a Ph.D. from the University of Wisconsin-Madison.

Bennion served as president of Snow College from 1982 to 1989. While Bennion was president of Snow College, the Career Center and honors program were started, as was the Snow College Foundation.

Bennion then began his tenure as president of Ricks College in 1989.  Some initiatives during his presidency at Ricks included preparing the college for the future as computer access for students was expanded. The "fast track" program was developed to allow more students to attend. As a result of that program, student enrollment increased to 8,250 students. The John Taylor Building, the first new building on campus in 17 years, was constructed during his tenure.

Bennion left Ricks College in 1997 to become the president of Southern Utah University.  In 2006, Bennion left Southern Utah University to serve as president of the LDS Church's New York New York South Mission.  He served as mission president until 2009.

Bennion is the grandson of prominent Utah educator Milton Bennion, who served as the first president of what would later become Southern Utah University.

In addition to being a mission president, Bennion has served in the LDS Church as a bishop and a member of a stake presidency. From 2013 to 2016, Bennion served as president of the Manhattan New York Temple.

References
BYU-Idaho bio of Bennion

1941 births
21st-century Mormon missionaries
American leaders of the Church of Jesus Christ of Latter-day Saints
American Mormon missionaries in Scotland
American Mormon missionaries in the United States
Cornell University alumni
Living people
Mission presidents (LDS Church)
People from Salt Lake City
Presidents of Brigham Young University–Idaho
Snow College faculty
Southern Utah University faculty
Temple presidents and matrons (LDS Church)
University of Utah alumni
University of Wisconsin–Madison alumni
Latter Day Saints from Wisconsin
Latter Day Saints from Utah
Latter Day Saints from Idaho
Latter Day Saints from New York (state)